is a Japanese idol group who have one charted single in Oricon.

History
Their debut album Tebasaki no Oishī Tabekata reached #1 on Oricon Album Daily Ranking. They mobilized a record 1,004 people at their one-man live in Zepp Nagoya two years after the debut.

Members
Source:

Discography

References

External links
Official site (in Japanese)
Twitter accounts:
 
 
 
 
 
 

Japanese idol groups
Japanese pop music groups
Musical groups from Aichi Prefecture